The Slovak Super Liga is the top level football league in Slovakia, currently known as the Fortuna Liga due to a sponsorship arrangement. It was formed in 1993 following the dissolution of Czechoslovakia. The record for most titles is eleven, held by Slovan Bratislava, who are the current title holders.

History

Czechoslovakia period
Slovakia was part of Czechoslovakia (1918–1939 and 1945–1993). The first Slovak championship Zväzové Majstrovstvá Slovenska was played between Slovak teams (1925–1933); until 1935-36, no Slovak team played in the Czechoslovak (professional, state) league. After the dissolution of Czechoslovakia in 1939 and the establishment of the German-allied Slovak Republic, the sole Slovak club in the Czechoslovak, ŠK Bratislava, played in the new Slovak league, the Slovenská liga (1939–1945).

Winners:

Zväzové Majstrovstvá Slovenska (1925–1933)
1925 - 1. ČsŠK Bratislava 
1925–26 - 1. ČsŠK Bratislava 
1926–27 - 1. ČsŠK Bratislava 
1927–28 - SK Žilina 
1928–29 - SK Žilina 
1929–30 - 1. ČsŠK Bratislava 
1930–31 - Ligeti SC 
1931–32 - 1. ČsŠK Bratislava 
1932–33 - SC Rusj Uzhorod

Slovenská liga (1939–1945)
1938–39 - Sparta Považská Bystrica 
1939–40 - ŠK Bratislava 
1940–41 - ŠK Bratislava 
1941–42 - ŠK Bratislava 
1942–43 - OAP Bratislava 
1943–44 - ŠK Bratislava 
1944–45 - abandoned in September 1944

Slovak winners of the Czechoslovak 1. League

Format
Throughout the Fortuna liga history, the number of clubs competing at the top level in 1996 has increased, in 2000 has been gradually decreased and in 2006 has again increased. Below is a complete record of how many teams played in each season throughout the league's history:

Number of teams

Sponsorship

Current teams (2021–2022)

Source for teams:

Champions

Source for list of championship winners:

Performance by club
Teams in bold are currently in the Superliga.

Titles by city

All-Time Table
The All-time table is an overall record of all match results, points, and goals of every team that has played in Slovak Super Liga since its inception in 1993. 
The table as of the end of 2021–22 season. Teams in bold are part of the 2022–23 Fortuna liga.top-flight. 
There is no club that played all seasons in top-flight. The best clubs in that respect - MŠK Žilina and Spartak Trnava missed 1 season, Slovan Bratislava missed 2 seasons. 

S = Number of seasons; P = Matches played; W = Matches won; D = Matches drawn; L = Matches lost; F = Goals for; A = Goals against; GD = Goal difference; Pts = Points

aSpartak Myjava withdrew from the league on 21 December 2016, and their results from season 2016-17 were expunged.
 DAC had 6 points deducted in 2013/14 season.

League at 2022–23:

All time top scorers
The table is accurate as of the end of the 2015–16 season.

In European competitions

UEFA coefficients

The following data indicates Slovak coefficient rankings between European football leagues.

Country ranking
UEFA League Ranking as of 31 July 2022:
 23.  (24)  Allsvenskan (18.625)
 24.  (23)  Parva Liga (17.125) 
 25.  (29)  Slovak Super Liga (16.250)
 26.  (28)  Nemzeti Bajnokság I (16.250) 
 27.  (26)  Liga I (15.750)

Club ranking
UEFA 5-year Club Ranking as of 17 March 2023:
 69.  Slovan Bratislava (22.000)
 140.  Spartak Trnava (10.500)
 159.  DAC Dunajská Streda (8.500)
 319.  Žilina (3.500)
 319.  MFK Ružomberok (3.500)
 319.  Trenčín (3.150)

Transfers

Fortuna liga have produced numerous players who have gone on to represent the Slovak national football team. Over the last period there has been a steady increase of young players leaving Fortuna liga after a few years of first team football and moving on to play football in leagues of a higher standard.

Record departures

*-unofficial fee

Record arrivals

The Golden Star
Based on an idea of Umberto Agnelli, the honor of Golden Star for Sports Excellence was introduced to recognize sides that have won multiple championships or other honours by the display of gold stars on their team badges and jerseys.

The current officially sanctioned Fortuna liga stars are:
 ŠK Slovan Bratislava received in 2009
 MŠK Žilina received in 2010

References

External links 
 
 Slovak football association website
 Current Super Liga table at eurorivals
 Super Liga results by round at The-Sports.org
 Slovak football website
 Slovak football website
 Slovak all-time table
 Slovak football leagues - standings, results

 
1
Slovakia
Professional sports leagues in Slovakia

it:Campionato slovacco di calcio